The Overmyer Network, later the United Network, was a short lived television network. It was intended to be a fourth national commercial network in the United States, competing with the Big Three television networks. The network was founded by self-made millionaire Daniel H. Overmyer, who started WDHO-TV (now WNWO-TV, an NBC affiliate), in his birthplace, Toledo, Ohio, which had signed on the air on May 3, 1966. Overmyer had construction permits for several other UHF stations that were intended to be owned-and-operated stations of the new network. Before going on the air, the majority interest in those stations was sold to AVC Corporation in March 1967. A social conservative ("I'm against smut," he declared), Overmyer had decided to create a nationwide hookup, enticing existing stations with a 50-50 profit split with potential affiliates (something that the established network's affiliates had been trying to get from ABC, CBS and NBC for years). Under the leadership of former ABC television president Oliver Treyz, the ON was scheduled to debut in the fall of 1967 with anywhere from 75 to 125 affiliates with an 8 hour broadcasting day.

From ON to UN
The network planned to offer eight hours of programming per day, seven days per week, to its affiliate stations. A daily news service, from United Press International, would provide each station with news. Cultural and sports programming, including Tales from the Great Book (an animated Bible series) and regional games of the Continental Football League, were also planned. By July 1966, 35 stations had agreed to affiliate with the new network.

Before the network even went on the air, Overmyer was forced to sell a majority share to investors, although he remained the largest shareholder. In early 1967, Overmyer tried to persuade the Mutual Broadcasting System (who had toyed with the idea of their own TV network in the late 1940s) to engage in a merger of the two networks, as a way to raise more money in the venture. The Mutual board turned thumbs-down on the merger proposal, but three Mutual stockholders formed a separate group with 11 wealthy western businessmen to buy out Overmyer. Rechristened The United Network, which used an upper-case U inside a television screen as the network's logo, the new network signed on the air on May 1, 1967 with The Las Vegas Show on 106 stations. Hosted by Bill Dana from the Hotel Hacienda in Las Vegas, the two-hour late-night show featured regulars Ann Elder, Pete Barbutti, Danny Meahan, Joanne Worley, Cully Richards and Jack Sheldon.

The network itself, except for a few independent stations in the larger markets, was mostly made up of CBS stations who aired The Las Vegas Show at 11:30 local time, tape delayed from the 11:00 start seen on United-only east coast stations. The network called WPIX in New York City and KHJ-TV in Los Angeles their flagship stations, even though neither was owned by Overmyer/United. Additionally, the WPIX broadcast was often delayed until the weekend due to their commitment to New York Yankees baseball. The network also lacked clearance in some large cities, including San Francisco (which was waiting for KEMO to be approved by the FCC).

The end
The average viewership for The Las Vegas Show was 2.6 million. Despite the hype, initially good reviews and high-caliber guest stars, the UN quickly started to bleed money; the transmission lines leased from AT&T, which was the main carrier for television network transmissions at the time, proved to be too expensive. Sources close to United also claimed that the network launch was too close to the end of the traditional broadcast season, when major sponsors were near the end of their advertising budgets. (During the last days of operation, network president Oliver Treyz made an on-air appeal to potential sponsors, pointing out that air time on The Las Vegas Show was a mere $6,000 a minute, barely a third of what NBC was charging for The Tonight Show.) Both the show and the network disappeared after the June 1 (some sources say June 3 or June 5) broadcast.

A notice was sent to the network's 107 affiliate stations the first week of June. The notice stated:

At the time of the company's bankruptcy declaration, the United Network had accrued a nearly $700,000 debt.

Overmyer / United affiliates
The Las Vegas Show was aired in the following markets as verified by citations:

Known markets that did not air The Las Vegas Show: San Francisco, CA, Birmingham, AL, Knoxville, TN, Lincoln, NE, Baton Rouge, LA, Fort Wayne, IN, Columbus, OH, Dayton, OH, Des Moines. IA Louisville, KY, Sacramento, CA, Lexington, KY, Providence, RI, Raleigh, NC, Tulsa, OK, Jackson, MS, Albany - Schenectady, NY, Scranton, PA, Harrisburg, PA, York - Lancaster, PA, Altoona - Johnstown, PA, Johnson City, TN, Tallahassee, FL, Amarillo, TX, Lubbock, TX, Youngstown, OH, Little Rock, AR, Austin, TX, Temple, TX, Bryan, TX,  Abilene, TX, Portland, ME, Bangor, ME, Madison, WI, Charleston- Huntington, WV, Wheeling, WV, Steubenville, OH, Augusta, GA, Ft. Myers, FL, Evansville, IN, Florence, SC, Wilmington, NC, Cadillac-Traverse City, MI, Hannibal, MO/Quincy, IL, Cedar Rapids, IA, Sioux City, IA, Sioux Falls, SD, Rapid City, SD, Cape Girardeau, MO/Paducah, KY/Harrisburg, IL, Binghamton, NY, Topeka, KS, Idaho Falls, ID, Boise, ID, Twin Falls, ID, Billings, MT, Great Falls, MT, Butte, MT, Missoula, MT, Springfield, MO, West Palm Beach, FL, Eugene, OR, Roswell, NM, Eureka, CA, Salinas-Monterey, CA, Yakima, WA, Harligen-Brownsville, TX, Chico-Redding, CA, Albany, GA, Cheyenne, WY, Columbus, MS, Lafayette, LA, Marquette, MI, Meridian, MS, Waco, TX,  Watertown, NY, Yuma, AZ, Burlington, VT, Ottumwa, IA, Mason City, IA, Lewiston, ID, Oak Hill, WV, Salisbury, MD, Jefferson City - Columbia, MO, Lacrosse, WI, Mankato, MN, Honolulu - Hilo - Wailuku, HI, Fairbanks, AK, Biloxi, MS, Hattiesburg, MS, Alexandria, LA, Lake Charles, LA Savannah, GA, Macon, GA
TV markets that do not have Newspapers.com references available for The Las Vegas Show: Huntsville, AL, Chattanooga, TN, Anchorage, AK

References

External links
 Overmyer-A Man And His Network uhfhistory.com K.M. Richards
 List of United Network Affiliates in top 25 TV markets from citations 
 Television Factbook 1967 Edition No. 37 Stations Volume 
 Television Factbook 1967 Edition No. 37 Services Volume 

Defunct television networks in the United States
Television channels and stations established in 1965
Television channels and stations disestablished in 1967
1967 disestablishments in the United States
1965 establishments in the United States